The Burlingame–Noon House is a historic house built around 1800 in Cumberland, Rhode Island.

The structure was originally a simple, one-and-one-half-story, five-room-plan, centre-chimney Federal style cottage, constructed in the first decades of the 19th century. In the middle of the century, it was enlarged into a two-and-one half-story, flank-gable Greek Revival house. It has panelled corner pilasters and a trabeated central entrance with sidelights and pilasters in a five-bay facade. The house has had few changes since the mid-nineteenth century and is notable for its architecture, including original Federal-period interior trim, which reflects transformations and adaptation in Cumberland's early history.

The house was added to the National Register of Historic Places in 1974.

See also
National Register of Historic Places listings in Providence County, Rhode Island

References

Houses on the National Register of Historic Places in Rhode Island
Houses in Cumberland, Rhode Island
National Register of Historic Places in Providence County, Rhode Island
Greek Revival houses in Rhode Island